Prometheus, Symphonia Ignis Divinus (Latin: "Prometheus, Symphony: The Divine Fire", also sometimes stylized as Prometheus — Symphonia Ignis Divinus or Prometheus: Symphonia Ignis Divinus) is the second and final studio album by Italian symphonic power metal band Luca Turilli's Rhapsody, created by Luca Turilli after his departure from Rhapsody of Fire. It was released on June 19, 2015 via Nuclear Blast.
Turilli considers it as one of the most important albums of his career: Prometheus, Symphonia Ignis Divinus was the first ever to be mixed in Dolby Atmos and the music of the same was used by Dolby and Yamaha to promote Dolby Atmos technology worldwide.

It is the only album with Alex Landenburg on drums, following Alex Holzwarth's departure shortly after the recording of the previous album Ascending to Infinity in order to focus on Rhapsody of Fire. The first single, "Rosenkreuz (The Rose and The Cross)" was released April 24, 2015.

Composition 
Luca Turilli composed the songs and arranged all the orchestral parts of the album in seven months. The creation of the album involved three more months of production, over 50 days of mixing, working with two choirs, several special guests, including Ralf Scheepers (Primal Fear), Dan Lucas (KARO), and David Readman (Pink Cream 69).

The album contains 70 minutes of epic music, sounding cinematic, bombastic and dramatic. The music is meant to lead the listener on an emotional and memorable journey between quantum gates, parallel dimensions, myths and legends hiding cosmic truths, ancestral secrets and spiritual revelations.

Track listing

Personnel 
Band members
Alessandro Conti - lead vocals
Luca Turilli - guitar, keyboards, orchestral arrangements, producer, engineer, cover concept
Dominique Leurquin - guitar
Patrice Guers - bass
 Alex Landenburg - drums

Additional musicians
Ralf Scheepers - co-lead vocals on "Thundersteel"
David Readman - vocals
Dan Lucas - vocals
Bridget Fogle - vocals
Emilie Ragni - vocals
Production
Sebastian Roeder - engineer, mixing
Christoph Stickel - mastering
Stefan "Heile" Heilemann - cover art

Charts

References

Luca Turilli albums
2015 albums
Nuclear Blast albums